Dietlikon is a railway station in the Swiss canton of Zürich and municipality of Dietlikon (Glatt Valley). The station is located on the Zürich to Winterthur railway line.

The station has a side platform and a central platform, providing three platform faces and serving all three tracks passing through the station. To the south of the station, the three tracks diverge into two twin-track railway lines, one to Zürich via Wallisellen and the other to Zürich via .

Dietlikon station is not to be confused with Dietikon railway station located in Dietikon in the Limmat Valley (canton of Zürich).

Service 
Dietlikon station is served by Zurich S-Bahn lines S3, S8 and S19. A number of other S-Bahn lines pass through the station without stopping. On weekends, there are three nighttime S-Bahn services (SN1, SN6, SN8) offered by ZVV.

Summary of all S-Bahn services:

 Zürich S-Bahn:
 Nighttime S-Bahn (only during weekends):

Gallery

References

External links 

Dietlikon station on Swiss Federal Railway's web site

Railway stations in the canton of Zürich
Swiss Federal Railways stations